Gustav Vasas intåg i Stockholm 1523 (or Gustav Vasa enters Stockholm 1523) is a painting painted for the Nationalmuseum in Stockholm by the Swedish painter Carl Larsson. It was completed in 1908. The painting depicts Gustav Vasa of Sweden as he is about to enter Stockholm in 1523 to be king.

Larsson started planning to paint the picture in 1897, but was not allowed to start working until November 1906. The canvasses were largely completed by November 1907, and were hung on the walls on Nationalmuseum on January 28, 1908.

References 
 Bo Lindwall: Carl Larsson och Nationalmuseum, Rabén & Sjögren, Stockholm 1969. 
 Georg Nordensvan: Carl Larsson. Andra delen. 1890-1919, Norstedts, Stockholm 1921.

1908 paintings
Paintings by Carl Larsson
Paintings in the collection of the Nationalmuseum Stockholm
Horses in art
Swedish War of Liberation
Gustav I of Sweden